Such a Little Queen is a 1914 American silent film starring Mary Pickford. It is based on a 1909 play by Channing Pollock which starred Elsie Ferguson. This film would later be remade in 1921 with Constance Binney in the lead. Cinematographer Ernest Haller was in charge of photography on both films.

The 1914 film is now considered a lost film. It is described as being a romantic comedy in five parts.

Cast
Mary Pickford as Queen Anna Victoria
Carlyle Blackwell as King Stephen
Harold Lockwood as Robert Trainor
Russell Bassett as The Prime Minister
Arthur Hoops as Prince Eugene

See also
List of lost films

References

External links

program cover or lobby sheet
press advert cover

American silent feature films
American films based on plays
Films directed by Edwin S. Porter
Films directed by Hugh Ford
Lost American films
American black-and-white films
American romantic comedy films
1910s romantic comedy films
1914 lost films
Lost comedy films
Lost romance films
1914 comedy films
1910s American films
Silent romantic comedy films
Silent American comedy films
1910s English-language films